The Mannington Township School District is a community public school district that serves students in pre-kindergarten through eighth grade from Mannington Township, in Salem County, New Jersey, United States.

As of the 2018–19 school year, the district, comprised of one school, had an enrollment of 156 students and 17.6 classroom teachers (on an FTE basis), for a student–teacher ratio of 8.9:1. In the 2016–17 school year, Mannington had the 31st smallest enrollment of any school district in the state, with 158 students.

The district is classified by the New Jersey Department of Education as being in District Factor Group "CD", the sixth-highest of eight groupings. District Factor Groups organize districts statewide to allow comparison by common socioeconomic characteristics of the local districts. From lowest socioeconomic status to highest, the categories are A, B, CD, DE, FG, GH, I and J.

Public school students in ninth through twelfth grades attend Salem High School in Salem City, together with students from Elsinboro Township, Lower Alloways Creek Township and Quinton Township, as part of a sending/receiving relationship with the Salem City School District. As of the 2018–19 school year, the high school had an enrollment of 374 students and 44.0 classroom teachers (on an FTE basis), for a student–teacher ratio of 8.5:1.

School
The Mannington Township School had an enrollment of 157 students in grades PreK-8 during the 2018–19 school year.

Administration
Core members of the district's administration are:
Kristin Williams, Superintendent
Karen Mathews, Business Administrator / Board Secretary

Board of education
The district's board of education, comprised of seven members, sets policy and oversees the fiscal and educational operation of the district through its administration. As a Type II school district, the board's trustees are elected directly by voters to serve three-year terms of office on a staggered basis, with either two or three seats up for election each year held (since 2012) as part of the November general election. The board appoints a superintendent to oversee the day-to-day operation of the district.

References

External links
Mannington Township School
 
School Data for the Mannington Township School, National Center for Education Statistics

Mannington Township, New Jersey
New Jersey District Factor Group CD
School districts in Salem County, New Jersey
Public K–8 schools in New Jersey